The Football Association of Finland (abbr. SPL) is the governing body of football in Finland. It was founded in Helsinki on 19 May 1907.

The SPL organises the men's and women's national football teams, and the second and third tiers of national football. The premier division Veikkausliiga is organized by a distinct organisation, and the lower tiers (the fourth tier and below) are organized by the 12 district organisations. The SPL is based in the Finnish capital city of Helsinki.

Background
The SPL has more than 1,000 member clubs and approximately 140,000 registered players. The Finnish Gallup survey has indicated that football is a popular pastime with around 500,000 Finns interested in the sport. The SPL is Finland's largest amateur sports federation.

The association was also the governing body of bandy in Finland until Finland's Bandy Association was founded in 1972. In 1928, it also arranged the first Finland ice hockey championship, before the 1929 establishment of the Finnish Ice Hockey Association.

District organisations
At the more local level Finnish football is administered by the following 12 district organisations of the SPL:

Ålands Fotbollförbund
SPL Helsingin piiri
SPL Itä-Suomen piiri
SPL Kaakkois-Suomen piiri
SPL Keski-Pohjanmaan piiri
SPL Keski-Suomen piiri
SPL Pohjois-Suomen piiri
SPL Satakunnan piiri
SPL Tampereen piiri
SPL Turun piiri
SPL Uudenmaan piiri
SPL Vaasan piiri

There were also 12 other district organisations that no longer exist.

Publications
The association publishes several magazines, including now-defunct monthly magazine Futari.

Presidents
Walter Flander 1907–1908
John Catani 1909
Uno Westerholm 1910–1911
Carolus Lindberg 1912
Walter Qvist 1913–1917
Erik von Frenckell 1918–1952
Juuso Walden 1953–1963
Osmo P. Karttunen 1963–1974
Ove H. Rehn 1974–1975
Jouko Loikkanen 1975–1983
Lauri Pöyhönen 1983–1987
 1987–1997
Pekka Hämäläinen 1997–2009
Sauli Niinistö 2009–2012
Markku Lehtola 2012 (interim)
Pertti Alaja 2012–2017
Markku Lehtola 2017–2018 (interim)
Ari Lahti 2018 to date

References

External links

 
Finland at UEFA.com
Finland at FIFA.com

1907 establishments in Finland
Sports organizations established in 1907
Football in Finland
Futsal in Finland
Organisations based in Helsinki
Finland
Football
Bandy in Finland
Ice hockey in Finland
Defunct ice hockey governing bodies
Defunct bandy governing bodies
Sport in Helsinki
Football Federation of Finland